Aldin is an English surname, derived from the Anglo-Saxon elements eald, meaning "old", and wine, meaning "friend".

It may also appear as a representation of the second half of Muslim names ending in ad-Din. Probably arising from this, it has become used as a male Bosnian given name. It may refer to:

English surname
Cecil Aldin (1870–1935), British artist and illustrator best known for his paintings of animals and rural life
Frederic Aldin Hall (1854–1925), chancellor of Washington University in St. Louis from 1913 until 1923
Jamal Aldin Omar (1960–2020), general in the Sudanese Armed Forces
L. Aldin Porter (born 1931), general authority of The Church of Jesus Christ of Latter-day Saints since 1987
Aldin Grange for Bearpark railway station, railway station that operated in County Durham, England

Bosnian given name
Aldin Bašić (born 1998), Swedish professional footballer
Aldin Adžović (born 1994), Montenegrin football midfielder
Aldin Aganovic (born 2000), Austrian footballer
Aldin Ayo (born 1977), Filipino basketball coach
Aldin Čajić (born 1992), Bosnian footballer
Aldin Đidić (born 1983), Bosnian footballer
Aldin Grout (1803–1894), American missionary to Zululand
Aldin Gurdijeljac (born 1978), Serbian-born Bosnian footballer
Aldin Kurić (born 1970), Bosnian singer, songwriter and composer, known by his stage name Al'Dino
Aldin Šetkić (born 1987), professional Bosnian tennis player
Aldin Spahović, Bosnian volleyball player
Aldin Turkeš (born 1996), professional footballer

See also
Aldein
Aldina
Aldine (disambiguation)
Khaldin (disambiguation)

References

Bosniak masculine given names
Bosnian masculine given names